Gerry Carroll (born 27 April 1987) is a People Before Profit politician from Belfast, Northern Ireland, who has represented the Belfast West constituency in the Northern Ireland Assembly since May 2016. From 2014 until 2016 he also represented the Black Mountain district electoral area on Belfast City Council.

Career
When aged 16, Carroll fund-raised with fellow activists to travel to Edinburgh, Scotland for the Make Poverty History protest. He contested the 2011 Belfast West by-election—triggered by the resignation of Gerry Adams—for the People Before Profit, and won 7.6% of the vote. At the 2014 Belfast City Council election he gained one of the seven seats in the Black Mountain electoral area from Sinn Féin, coming third. Following his election, he said that he did not describe himself as a nationalist or a unionist, instead choosing to identify as a socialist. He said: "There is a lot of anger in West Belfast at the minute over the situation at Royal Victoria Hospital's A&E, the privatisation of leisure centres and the Casement Park issues...residents have been trampled on". He contested Belfast West again at the 2015 general election, this time coming second, gaining 19.2% of the vote and reducing the Sinn Féin majority from 57.1% to 35.0%.

After being elected a councillor, Carroll criticised the large pay rises that were given to councillors whilst other council staff suffered effective pay cuts, and campaigned against privatisation and cuts.

He criticised Sinn Féin's "support for capitalism", and spoke against the "sectarian nature" of politics in Northern Ireland. In August 2014 he said: "In Northern Ireland sectarianism is at the heart of the state. I don't accept that, but then again I don't accept the conservative right-wing state in the south". At the 2016 Assembly election he was elected an MLA for Belfast West, topping the poll on the first count and gaining a seat from Rosie McCorley of Sinn Féin. He was re-elected at the 2017 election; however, his vote fell from 22.9% to 12.2% in the face of a 4% overall Sinn Féin vote increase that cost fellow People Before Profit MLA Eamonn McCann and the SDLP's Alex Attwood their re-election bids.

Carroll's support for Brexit, in an area in which three-quarters of voters voted Remain, has attracted criticism from Sinn Féin and pro-EU activists.

Carroll stood in the 2019 general election and came in second place behind incumbent Sinn Féin MP Paul Maskey.

Electoral history

2019 UK general election

2017 UK general election

2017 Northern Ireland Assembly election

2016 Northern Ireland Assembly election

2015 UK general election

2014 Belfast City Council election

2011 UK by-election

2011 Northern Ireland Assembly election

References

1987 births
Living people
Alumni of Ulster University
Northern Ireland MLAs 2016–2017
Northern Ireland MLAs 2017–2022
People Before Profit Alliance MLAs
21st-century British politicians
Politicians from Belfast
Socialists from Northern Ireland
British Eurosceptics
Northern Ireland MLAs 2022–2027